Kings Canyon may refer to:

 Kings Canyon (Northern Territory), a canyon within the Watarrka National Park in  Australia
 Kings Canyon (Millard County, Utah), a canyon in the Confusion Range of west-central Utah, United States, which the combined U.S. Highway 6/U.S. Highway 50 pass through
 Kings Canyon (Uintah County, Utah), a canyon within the Uintah and Ouray Indian Reservation in southwest Uintah County, Utah, United States
 Kings Canyon National Park, a national park in California, United States, named for Kings Canyon, a canyon within the park